La Roche-Derrien is a former commune in the Côtes-d'Armor department of Brittany in northwestern France. On 1 January 2019, it was merged into the new commune La Roche-Jaudy.

Population

Inhabitants of La Roche-Derrien are called rochois in French.

See also
Communes of the Côtes-d'Armor department

References

External links

Official website 

Former communes of Côtes-d'Armor